Shotorak Makhurin is a village in Hesar Kharvan Rural District, Mohammadiyeh District, Alborz County, Qazvin Province, Iran. At the 2006 census, its population was 1,071, in 269 families.

References 

Populated places in Alborz County